Intelsat 508, previously named Intelsat V F-8, was a communications satellite operated by Intelsat. Launched in 1984, it was the eighth of fifteen Intelsat V satellites to be launched. The Intelsat V series was constructed by Ford Aerospace, based on the Intelsat-V satellite bus. Intelsat V F-8 was part of an advanced series of satellites designed to provide greater telecommunications capacity for Intelsat's global network.

The satellite was successfully launched into space on October 19, 1983, at 00:45 UTC, by means of an Ariane 1 vehicle from the Guiana Space Centre, Kourou, French Guiana. It had a launch mass of 1,928 kg. The Intelsat V F-8 was equipped with 4 Ku-band transponders more 21 C-band transponders for 12,000 audio circuits and 2 TV channels.

References

Spacecraft launched in 1984
Intelsat satellites